Sherbourne is a populated place in the parish of Saint John, Barbados. Sherbourne is mainly a residential area, located south of Highway 3C. It is home of the Sherbourne New Testament Church of God.

See also
 List of cities, towns and villages in Barbados

References

Saint John, Barbados
Populated places in Barbados